Yunis Huseynov (born 1 February 1965) is an Azerbaijani football manager and former footballer. He currently manages Keşla FK. Huseynov made 33 appearances for the Azerbaijan national football team, scoring four goals.

Career statistics

international

International goals

Honours

Club
Neftchi Baku
Azerbaijan Premier League: 1992, 1995–96, 1996–97
Azerbaijan Cup: 1994–95, 1995–96, 1998–99

Individual
 Azerbaijani Footballer of the Year (2): 1994, 1998

Personal life
Hüseynov is married to politician and chess grandmaster Aynur Sofiyeva and they have two children.

References

External links
 

1965 births
Living people
Sportspeople from Ganja, Azerbaijan
Soviet footballers
Azerbaijani footballers
Azerbaijan international footballers
Azerbaijani expatriate footballers
Association football forwards
Khazar Lankaran FK managers
Kapaz PFK players
Azerbaijani football managers
Neftçi PFK players
Soviet Top League players